Florinda Meza García (born 8 February 1949) is a Mexican actress, comedian, television producer, and screenwriter. She is best known as Doña Florinda in El Chavo del Ocho, La Chimoltrufia in Chespirito, and other various roles in El Chapulín Colorado.

Early life and career
Meza was born in Juchipila, Zacatecas, the daughter of Emilia García and Hector Meza. She was cast by Roberto Gómez Bolaños to play "Doña Florinda" (and later "La Popis") in the Televisa sitcom El Chavo del Ocho, which would become a major international hit. The show would last from February 26, 1973 to January 7, 1980 (although the sketch would continue until 1992), during which she and Gómez Bolaños began a lifelong romance that never produced any children. During her tenure on the Chespirito television series, she was also known to have played Édgar Vivar's character "Botija"'s wife "María Expropiación Petronila Lascuráin y Torquemada", famously known as "La Chimoltrufia" in the sketch "Los Caquitos" (along side Gómez Bolaños who played the role of Chómpiras). Meza would also participate prominent roles in Chespirito's other main sitcom, El Chapulín Colorado.

After production of Chespirito ended in 1995, she and Gómez Bolaños began touring extensively. The couple would eventually get married in a civil ceremony on 19 November 2004 after a 27-year relationship.

Meza would also participate in several movies, as well as produced telenovelas including La Dueña, Alguna Vez Tendremos Alas, and Milagro y Magia, in which she also acted.

Filmography

As actress

As a producer

References

External links

1949 births
Living people
Chespirito actors
Chespirito
Mexican film actresses
Mexican television actresses
People from Zacatecas